Donald R. Lehmann (born 1944) is the George E. Warren Professor of Business Professor at Columbia Business School. A Fellow of the American Marketing Association, he is known for his work on choice and decision making, innovation, and new product development.

Lehmann receive his BA from Union College, and his doctorate from Purdue University in 1969 . His doctoral thesis "Choice among similar alternatives : an application of a model of individual preference to the selection of television shows by viewers" was written under the supervision of Frank Bass.

Selected works 
Lehmann, Donald R., and Russell S. Winer. Analysis for Marketing Planning. Boston: McGraw-Hill, 1991, 1997,  2009. 
Translated into Japanese by Takamichi Inoue as  マーケティング計画 : 立案手法入門 / Māketingu keikaku: ritsuan shuhō nyūmon. Tōkyō: Bunshindō, 1991. 
Translated into Chinese as  Analysis for marketing planning = 营销策划分析 / Ying xiao ce hua fen xi. Beijing: Beijing da xue chu ban she, 2007.
Translated into Spanish as  Investigación y análisis de mercado.  México: Compañía Editorial Continental, 1998.
Product Managers Marketing Plan    产品经理的营销计划 /Chan pin jing li de ying xiao ji hua / Product manager's marketing plan / Donald R. Lehmann, Russell S. Winer. Beijing: Yu hang chu ban she, 1999.
Lehmann, Donald R., and Russell S. Winer. Product management. Maidenhead: McGraw-Hill Education, 2001, 2004. 
Translated into Chinese as:   产品管理 : 第4版 / Chan pin guan li. Beijing: Beijing da xue chu ban she, 2006.
Lehmann, Donald R., Sunil Gupta, and Joel H. Steckel. 'Marketing Research. Reading, MA: Addison-Wesley, 1998. 
Lehmann, Donald R., and Katherine E. Jocz. Reflections on the Futures of Marketing: Practice and Education. Cambridge, MA: Marketing Science Institute, 1997.

References

Fellows of the American Marketing Association
Living people
Columbia University faculty
1944 births